Khadga Bahadur Magar was a candidate from the Mangol National Organization Election Area of Udyapur-3 in Nepal. He ran in the November 2013 Constituent Assembly II Election, losing by 15 votes.

References

Living people
Year of birth missing (living people)
Place of birth missing (living people)